The Vantaa is a  long river in Southern Finland. One of the tributaries of the Vantaa river is Keravanjoki that flows through the town of Kerava north of Helsinki.

Use as water and power supply

The country's capital, Helsinki, uses water from the Vantaa river as its backup water supply if the Päijänne Water Tunnel needs to be repaired.

The Helsinki-based energy company Helsingin Energia has a working power station museum located at the mouth of Vantaanjoki. The  Hydropower Plant produces an average of 500 MWh annually.

Gallery

See also
 Kaljakellunta, an annual social event on the river
 Kerava River
 Kuhakoski

References

External links

Rivers of Finland
 Vantaa River